Neon is an unincorporated community in  Letcher County, Kentucky, United States. The Neon Post Office does exist. It was also known as Fleming-Neon.

References

Unincorporated communities in Letcher County, Kentucky
Unincorporated communities in Kentucky